Het geheim van het slot Arco is a 1915 Dutch silent drama film horror directed by Maurits Binger and Jan van Dommelen.

The English title is: The secret of castle Arco, the film consist of a Dutch cast while the production site was shot in Austria. The film is considered missing.

The storyline is about a man without a head that haunts the castle Arco in the 16th century. A man in the present day (1914) goes to the castle to find out if the story is true after which he finds something strange beneath the old castle floor.

Cast
 Jan van Dommelen
 Tilly Lus
 Willem van der Veer
 Constant van Kerckhoven jr
 Co Balfoort
 Louis van Dommelen
 Caroline van Dommelen

External links 
 

1915 films
Dutch silent feature films
Dutch black-and-white films
1915 drama films
Films directed by Maurits Binger
Films directed by Jan van Dommelen
Dutch drama films
Silent drama films